Roger Millar is an American land use engineer and government official serving as the Washington Secretary of Transportation.

Education 
Millar earned a degree from the University of Virginia, where he earned a Bachelor of Science civil engineering.

Career 
Miller has worked as a civil engineer for 38 years, and is a licensed engineer in six states, including Washington. Millar became a Fellow of the American Society of Civil Engineers in 1999. Miller has served in various capacities for the state Departments of Transportation of Florida, Michigan, Minnesota, Oregon, Tennessee, and Vermont.

Millar became Deputy Secretary of the Washington State Department of Transportation in October 2015, and was installed as Acting Secretary after Lynn Peterson, the previous secretary, was removed by the Washington State Senate.

References 

Living people
Year of birth missing (living people)
Place of birth missing (living people)
State cabinet secretaries of Washington (state)
American civil engineers
University of Virginia School of Engineering and Applied Science alumni
Fellows of the American Society of Civil Engineers